Astrolepis cochisensis is a species of fern known by the common name Cochise scaly cloak fern. It is native to the southwestern United States and northern Mexico, where it occupies mainly desert habitat, often on calcareous soils.

Description
The fern grows from a short rhizome. Some lack lobes altogether; others bear 1 to 4 lobes, asymmetrically arranged on the pinna. The lobes are broadly rounded, and the indentations between them are shallow.

The leaflets are coated in star-shaped scales on the upper surface and hairy lance-shaped scales beneath.

Notes and references

References

Works cited

External links
Jepson Manual Treatment
USDA Plants Profile

Pteridaceae
Ferns of California
Ferns of the United States
Flora of the Southwestern United States
Flora of the California desert regions
Flora of the Sonoran Deserts